West Pomeranian University of Technology, Szczecin ( is a technical university in Szczecin, Poland. The university was established on January 1. 2009 in Szczecin, from the merger of the Agricultural University in Szczecin and the Szczecin University of Technology. 
The first rector of the university was Professor Włodzimierz Kiernożycki. 
The university has 10 faculties with 47 fields of study. The university employs 2.3 thousand employees, and about 15 thousand studends are taught on the university. 
The main goal of the university's activity is to educate and conduct scientific research in the field of technical, agricultural, economic, biological, chemical and mathematical sciences.

History

The university was established on 1 January 2009. It had formerly existed as two academies: the Szczecin University of Technology and the University of Agriculture in Szczecin.

Faculties
# Faculty of Civil Engineering and Architecture (Wydział Budownictwa i Architektury), from Szczecin University of Technology:
 Architecture and urban planning
 Civil Engineering
 Civil Engineering - European Engineer
 Environmental Engineering
 Design

# Faculty of Computer Science and Information Technology (Wydział Informatyki), from Szczecin University of Technology:
 Information Technology
 Digital Engineering

# Faculty of Electrical Engineering (Wydział Elektryczny), from Szczecin University of Technology:
 Automation and Robotics
 Electronics and telecommunication
 Electrotechnics
 ICT

# Faculty of Mechanical Engineering and Mechatronics (Wydział Inżynierii Mechanicznej i Mechatroniki), from Szczecin University of Technology:
 Energetics
 Material Engineering
 Mechanical engineering
 Mechatronics
 Transport
 Production Engineering and Management

# Faculty of Chemical Engineering (Wydział Technologii i Inżynierii Chemicznej), from Szczecin University of Technology:
 Chemistry
 Chemical and Process Engineering
 Nanotechnology
 Environmental Protection
 Chemical Technology
 Commodity Science

# Faculty of Maritime Technology (Wydział Techniki Morskiej), from Szczecin University of Technology:
 Security Engineering
 Maritime Engineering
 Transport
 Construction of Yachts
 Refrigeration and Air Conditioning

# Faculty of Biotechnology and Animal Husbandry (Wydział Biotechnologii i Hodowli Zwierząt), from University of Agriculture in Szczecin:
 Biology
 Biotechnology
 Zootechny
 Bioinformatics - inter-directional studies

# Faculty of Environmental Management and Agriculture (Wydział Kształtowania Środowiska i Rolnictwa), from University of Agriculture in Szczecin:
 Landscape architecture
 Waste Management and Reclamation of Degraded Areas
 Spatial Economy
 Environmental Protection
 Gardening
 Agriculture
 Agricultural and Forestry Technology

# Faculty of Food Sciences and Fisheries (Wydział Nauk o Żywności i Rybactwa), from University of Agriculture in Szczecin:
 Applied Microbiology
 Fishing Science
 Food Technology and human Nutrition
 Commodity Science
 Food and Water Environment Analysis - inter-directional studies
 Food and Water Environment Engineering - inter-directional studies
 Safety and quality of food Management

# Faculty of Economics (Wydział Ekonomiczny), from University of Agriculture in Szczecin:
 Economy
 Management

See also
 Szczecin University of Technology

References

External links

2009 establishments in Poland
Universities and colleges in Szczecin
Szczecin
Szczecin
Universities and colleges formed by merger in Poland